Veskimetsa (Estonian for "Mill Forest") is a subdistrict in the district of Haabersti, Tallinn, the capital of Estonia. It has a population of 17. It is mainly covered by the area of the Tallinn Zoo.

References

Subdistricts of Tallinn